This is a list of American films released in 1966.

A Man for All Seasons won the Academy Award for Best Picture.

A–B

C–H

I–R

S–Z

See also
 1966 in the United States

References

External links

1966 films at the Internet Movie Database
List of 1966 box office number-one films in the United States

1966
Films
Lists of 1966 films by country or language